Kingianthus is a genus of flowering plants in the family Asteraceae.

The entire genus is endemic to Ecuador.

 Species
 Kingianthus paniculatus (Turcz.) H.Rob. - Ecuador (Chimborazo, Cotopaxi, Imbabura, Pichincha, + Tungurahua Provinces)
 Kingianthus paradoxus H.Rob. - Ecuador (Azuay + Loja Provinces)

References

 
Asteraceae genera
Endemic flora of Ecuador
Taxonomy articles created by Polbot